The 2009–10 North Carolina Tar Heels men's basketball team represented the University of North Carolina at Chapel Hill. Their head coach was Roy Williams. The team played its home games in the Dean Smith Center in Chapel Hill, North Carolina, and is a member of the Atlantic Coast Conference. They were the defending National Champions. This season represented the 100th season of basketball in the school's history.

The Tar Heels finished the season 20–17, 5–11 in ACC play and lost in the first round of the 2010 ACC men's basketball tournament. They received an invitation to the 2010 National Invitation Tournament where they advanced to the championship game before falling to Dayton.

Preseason 

The Tar Heels lost four starters from their 2008–09 Championship team and top backcourt reserve Bobby Frasor. Tyler Hansbrough, the Atlantic Coast Conference all-time leading scorer, was selected in the lottery of the 2009 NBA draft, going #13 to the Indiana Pacers. ACC Player of the Year Ty Lawson and 2009 NCAA tournament Most Outstanding Player Wayne Ellington also were drafted in the first round, by the Denver Nuggets and Minnesota Timberwolves respectively.  Senior swingman Danny Green would also get drafted by the Cleveland Cavaliers in the second round.

Top returnees are senior center Deon Thompson, who spent the Summer helping lead Team USA to a bronze at the World University Games and sophomore Ed Davis, who had got projected as a first-round draft pick. Reserve sophomores Larry Drew II and Tyler Zeller also return, and junior swingman Will Graves was reinstated over the Summer after a mid-season suspension by coach Roy Williams. Also returning is defensive stopper Marcus Ginyard, who took a medical redshirt for the 2008–09 campaign after starting as a junior for the 2007–08 Tar Heel team, who advanced to the Final Four. Joining the returnees is a recruiting class containing four McDonald's All-Americans and ranked as one of the top 5 in the Nation.

Despite the heavy losses for the defending champions, the Tar Heels were ranked in the top ten of both preseason polls when they got released on October 29, Even garnering a single vote for #1 in both the AP Poll and the Coaches' Poll.  UNC was ranked #6 in the AP and #4 in the Coaches poll.  The Tar Heels were also picked as the ACC pre-season favorite (with rival Duke) by the conference media, while Davis was chosen a member of the preseason All-ACC Team.

Other preseason honors for Tar Heel players included the inclusion of Davis and Thompson on the 50-man Wooden Award preseason candidate list, while Davis was also one of the 50 players named to the Naismith watch list.  Marcus Ginyard was named a preseason candidate for the Lowe's Senior CLASS Award, one of only two ACC players named to the 30-man list (with Duke's Jon Scheyer).

100th anniversary celebration

UNC kicked off their 100th season with an alumni game on September 4, featuring such NBA players as Vince Carter, Antawn Jamison and Marvin Williams.  At halftime of the event, the 2009 National Championship banner got unveiled, and UNC legend Michael Jordan got honored for his election to the Basketball Hall of Fame.  The event also proved to be an excellent recruiting tool for UNC, as 2011 forward prospect James McAdoo committed to North Carolina at the event and Harrison Barnes, the 2010 #1 recruit in the ESPNU and Scout.com rankings, would later commit to UNC after attending the event.  Members of the 2009 championship team received their championship rings at halftime of the UNC-Citadel football game on September 5.

In their season opener against Florida International, the Tar Heels donned throwback uniforms in the style of the 1957 undefeated national championship team – with distinctive red trim.  The Tar Heels wore the 1957 throwback uniforms again when they played Rutgers on December 28.

Recruiting

Coach Roy Williams signed a five-person class for 2009, including two-time Tennessee Division II-AA Mr. Basketball Leslie McDonald from Memphis, identical twins David and Travis Wear from California, and athletic combo guard Dexter Strickland from New Jersey.  But the crown jewel of the class was 6'10 forward John Henson of Tampa, Florida, rated the #1 PF by Scout.com.  Henson, Strickland and the Wear twins were all named to the McDonald's game in Miami.  Henson and Strickland were also named first-team Parade All-Americans, while McDonald and the Wears were called to the fourth team by the magazine.

Season

Non-conference season

UNC kicked off their non-conference schedule on November 9 against Florida International and new coach Isiah Thomas as a part of the Coaches Vs. Cancer Classic, defeating the Golden Panthers 88–72 at the Dean Smith Center.  There had been some controversy surrounding the game as FIU had threatened to pull out of the tournament when the brackets were released, and they found that they were not scheduled to play Ohio State as they had initially planned.

After home wins over North Carolina Central and Valparaiso, the Tar Heels began a tough out of conference slate which would include five teams ranked in the preseason Coaches' poll.  First was a trip to Madison Square Garden for the finals of the Coaches Vs. Cancer Classic.  After defeating #15 Ohio State 77–73 in their semifinal game, the Tar Heels lost the championship game 87–71 to #24 Syracuse.  UNC had a two-point lead at the half, but the Orange used a 25–3 run coming out of the locker room to defeat the young Tar Heels convincingly behind 25 points from forwarding Wesley Johnson.

In a 93–72 home win over Gardner-Webb on November 23, 2009, senior Deon Thompson became the 63rd player in UNC history to score 1000 points. The milestone capped a 22-point, 10-rebound performance from Thompson.  The game also featured a record-setting night as Gardner-Webb guard Grayson Flittner tied a Dean Smith Center record with nine three-pointers.  In their next game it was Roy Williams' turn to achieve a milestone as he won his 600th game in the Tar Heels' 80–73 win over Nevada.

Next up was #9 Michigan State in Chapel Hill as a part of the ACC – Big Ten Challenge. In this rematch of the 2009 NCAA title game, again beat the Spartans 89–82 behind Ed Davis' 22 points and Larry Drew II's 18 points and six assists. The next game got no more comfortable, as UNC traveled to Rupp Arena to face the #5 Kentucky Wildcats. The Tar Heels fell behind early as UK freshman John Wall sparked a 28–2 first-half run that punctuated a 15-point halftime deficit. The Tar Heels battled back to make the game close in the second half, but ultimately lost 68–66.

Following the Kentucky game, UNC defeated Presbyterian 103–64 at the Smith Center before traveling to Cowboys Stadium in Dallas to take on the #2 ranked Texas Longhorns in the first basketball game played at that venue. The Longhorns defeated the Tar Heels 103–90 behind Damion James' 25 points and 15 rebounds. Ed Davis had 21 points and nine rebounds in the loss. The Tar Heels rebounded with home wins over Marshall (98–61) and Rutgers (81–67). The Carolina front line of Davis, Thompson, Graves, and Zeller combined for 64 points and 30 rebounds in the win over Marshall, while freshman Dexter Strickland notched 18 in the win over Rutgers in the absence of Marcus Ginyard, who sat out the game with an ankle sprain.

Ginyard also missed the last two non-conference games. In a home contest against Albany, UNC also lost junior forward Will Graves to an ankle injury. The Tar Heels won the game 87–70 but would lose both Graves and reserve Justin Watts for their last non-conference game at the College of Charleston.  The Tar Heels played a real road game at Carolina First Arena down two starters.  Charleston's Cougars played the Heels shot for shot, sending the game into overtime with an Andrew Goudelock three-pointer. In overtime, the Cougars outscored the Tar Heels to take the game 82–79 in a big upset. Ed Davis had 19 points, 16 rebounds and five blocks in the losing effort.

Conference season

The Tar Heels entered conference play by hosting the Virginia Tech Hokies. The Tar Heels returned injured starters, Will Graves and Marcus Ginyard, while the Hokies welcomed back their star Malcolm Delaney. Delaney lived up to his preseason All-ACC billing, scoring 20 points in the first half as Virginia Tech led 38–34 at the intermission. But Larry Drew II, Will Graves and Ed Davis led a strong second half effort to lead the Tar Heels to a 78–64 win.

The next three games were not as positive for the Tar Heels. The Heels were beaten convincingly by Clemson 83–64 in a game that saw UNC commit 26 turnovers. The Tar Heels showed signs of life in their next match against Georgia Tech. After trailing the Yellow Jackets by as much as 20, UNC came storming back to take the lead with under a minute to play, behind Will Graves' 24 points. However, Georgia Tech scored the last three aspects of the game to get the win. The Tar Heels looked to get back to their winning ways against Wake Forest at home but were outscored in both halves, losing 82–69.  It marked the first time Roy Williams had lost three games in a row as Tar Heels head coach. The loss knocked the Tar Heels out of the national rankings for the first time since 2006.

Unfortunately, the Tar Heels were never really able to achieve any real consistency for the remainder of the season, going only 4–8 for the rest of the way. While they did manage to sweep rival North Carolina State, they were swept by Duke, including an 82–50 flogging to close the season. They ultimately finished 5–11 in conference play—only the fourth losing ACC record UNC has ever suffered, and easily the worst conference record in Williams' 22 years as a head coach. They also finished tied for ninth in the conference standings, only their third-ever finish below fourth in ACC play.

The Tar Heels briefly showed signs of life in the first half of the ACC tournament against Georgia Tech gaining an early lead, but a second-half swoon resulted in a 62–58 loss.

Postseason
The Tar Heels got left out of the 2010 NCAA Tournament, becoming the first defending national champion since Florida's 2007–08 unit to not make the next year's tournament while eligible to compete.  They were, however, selected for the 2010 National Invitation Tournament&mdash. Their first appearance in that tourney since 2003. Despite a 16–16 record, the Tar Heels were a #4 seed, allowing them to host a first-round game against William & Mary. The game was played in the Tar Heels' former home, Carmichael Arena, due to renovations at the Smith Center. After defeating William & Mary, the Tar Heels won road games at Mississippi State and UAB and advanced to the tournament's semi-finals in Madison Square Garden where they defeated Rhode Island in overtime. In the NIT championship game, they lost to Dayton 79–68 to close the season at 20–17. The 17 losses are the second-most in school history.

On April 1, Deon Thompson appeared in the NIT Championship game, giving him 152 career game appearances. This set the NCAA all-time career games played mark, formerly held by Wayne Turner of Kentucky and Walter Hodge of Florida.

Roster

Schedule

|-
!colspan=9| Exhibition

|-
!colspan=9| Non-conference regular season

|-
!colspan=9| ACC Regular Season

|-
!colspan=9| ACC tournament

|-
!colspan=9| National Invitation Tournament

Rankings

Team players drafted into the NBA

See also
2010 NCAA Division I men's basketball tournament
2009–10 NCAA Division I men's basketball season
2009–10 NCAA Division I men's basketball rankings

References

North Carolina
North Carolina Tar Heels men's basketball seasons
North Carolina
Tar
Tar